This is a list of stadiums in the Nordic countries by capacity. The Nordic countries are Sweden, Norway, Finland, Denmark and Iceland.
Stadiums with a capacity of 15,000 or more are included.

See also 

 List of European stadiums by capacity
 List of association football stadiums by capacity

References

External links
 Nordic Stadiums

Nordic
Nordic countries